Fenton Pete Mickeal (born February 22, 1978) is an American former professional basketball player, that served as an NBA scout for the Minnesota Timberwolves and Washington Wizards. He was selected by the Dallas Mavericks in the second round, with the 58th pick of the 2000 NBA draft.  He currently serves as the president of Mickeal Sports Group (MSG) which specializes in marketing and placing professional basketball players worldwide. Mickeal, is considered one of the greatest american player's to ever play in Europe. With 12 cup championships in the (ACB) Spain which is widely considered the second best league in the world. Along with a 2010 Euroleague Championship with Barcelona, he is a Junior college Hall of Famer with 2 national championships at Indian Hills. He is the current president of the Myrtle Beach International Combine, a college pre-draft combine that broke records in 2021 with 400,000 views on Twitch.

High school career
Born in Rock Island, Illinois, Mickeal attended Rock Island High School, the same school attended by former NBA player and coach Don Nelson. In two full seasons of varsity basketball, Mickeal broke the school's all-time scoring record.

College career
After high school, Mickeal played for two years as a small forward with Indian Hills Community College. As a sophomore at Indian Hills C.C., he was named National Junior College Player of the Year, after leading the team to its second straight national championship. For his junior year, he transferred to play at Cincinnati, where he played with the Cincinnati Bearcats. As a senior, he was named an Honorable Mention All-American by the Associated Press.

Professional career

NBA
After two productive seasons with Cincinnati, Mickeal entered the 2000 NBA Draft. After being drafted by the Dallas Mavericks, Mickeal participated in training camp with them. He never played for the Mavericks or any other NBA team in an actual game. Thus, Mickeal is 1 of 8 players that were selected in the 2000 NBA Draft, but never played a game in the league.

His contract with the Mavs was waived, but he was soon signed as a free agent by the New York Knicks.  He was on the injured reserve his entire time as a Knick, and was waived later in the season. In the 2002–03 season, he drew attention again from the NBA, being signed to a practice-squad contract with the Houston Rockets, before being waived a week later. He also played with the Orlando Magic in the Orlando Summer League and the Las Vegas Summer League in 2004.

American Basketball Association
After his unsuccessful run in the NBA, Mickeal went on to have great success in the ABA with the Tampa Bay ThunderDawgs, and particularly the Kansas City Knights. After leading the Knights to a 35–5 record in the 2001–02 season, Mickeal's team won that year's championship, and he was awarded the league MVP award and Final MVP award.

Asia
After the 2001–02 season in the ABA, Mickeal signed with the Talk 'N Text Phone Pals team of the Philippine Basketball Association. He also played in the South Korean League during the 2006–07 season, playing with Daegu Orions.

Europe
After playing with the Houston Rockets practice-squad, Mickeal returned overseas for the 2003–04 season. He played in the Greek League with both Peristeri and Makedonikos, with a brief 2004 interlude in the Russian SuperLeague with Dynamo Moscow. In 2005, he moved to the Spanish League club Breogán. After a season there, he went to the South Korean League for the 2006–07 season, playing with Daegu Orions, before returning to the Spain to play with the Spanish League club TAU Cerámica.

On June 29, 2009, he signed with the Spanish League club FC Barcelona. During the EuroLeague 2009–10 season, Mickeal played at small forward for FC Barcelona, and he helped them win the EuroLeague 2010 Final. In 2012, he was named to the All-ACB Finals Team.

On January 10, 2014, he signed with UCAM Murcia. On February 23, 2014 he parted ways with Murcia after playing only 5 games in ACB League.

Latin America
On March 9, 2014, he signed with Cangrejeros de Santurce of the Baloncesto Superior Nacional. However, he was released on May 31, 2014, due to his knee injury.

On October 28, 2014, Mickael signed with Bucaneros de La Guaira of Venezuela for the 2015 LPB season.

On November 26, 2015, he signed with Atenas de Córdoba of the Argentine Liga Nacional de Básquet. On December 19, 2015, he parted ways with Atenas after appearing in five games. On May 9, 2016, he re-signed with Atenas.

Post-playing career
After he retired from playing professional basketball, Mickeal became a scout, for the NBA's Minnesota Timberwolves.

References

External links
 Twitter Account
 Euroleague.net Profile
 Eurobasket.com Profile
 Spanish League Profile 
 TheDraftReview.com Profile

1978 births
Living people
African-American basketball players
American expatriate basketball people in Argentina
American expatriate basketball people in Greece
American expatriate basketball people in the Philippines
American expatriate basketball people in Russia
American expatriate basketball people in South Korea
American expatriate basketball people in Spain
American expatriate basketball people in Venezuela
American men's basketball players
Atenas basketball players
ABA All-Star Game players
Basketball players from Illinois
BC Dynamo Moscow players
Bucaneros de La Guaira players
Cangrejeros de Santurce basketball players
CB Breogán players
CB Murcia players
Cincinnati Bearcats men's basketball players
FC Barcelona Bàsquet players
Goyang Carrot Jumpers players
Indian Hills Warriors basketball players
Kansas City Knights players
Liga ACB players
Makedonikos B.C. players
Minnesota Timberwolves scouts
New York Knicks draft picks
Peristeri B.C. players
Philippine Basketball Association imports
Saski Baskonia players
Shooting guards
Small forwards
Sportspeople from Rock Island, Illinois
Tampa Bay ThunderDawgs players
TNT Tropang Giga players
Universiade medalists in basketball
Universiade gold medalists for the United States
Medalists at the 1999 Summer Universiade
21st-century African-American sportspeople
20th-century African-American sportspeople